Pickleweed Inlet is a small bay in Marin County, California, United States, located at .  It discharges to the west side of Richardson Bay, an arm of the San Francisco Bay.  The estuary contains mudflats used by various avifauna.  There is a well-used hiking trail that runs along Picklewood Inlet.

References

External links

Pickleweed Creek Rowing Guide

Wetlands of the San Francisco Bay Area
Estuaries of Marin County, California
Bays of California
Estuaries of California
Bays of Marin County, California